Silda Chandra Sekhar Mahavidyalaya, also known as Silda College, is an undergraduate,  coeducational college situated in Silda, Jhargram, West Bengal. It was established in the year 1971. The college is under Vidyasagar University.

Departments

Science

Chemistry
Physics
Mathematics

Arts and Commerce

Bengali
English
Santali
History
Political Science
Philosophy
Commerce
Geography
Sranskrit

Professional Course
Bachelor of Computer Application(BCA)

Accreditation
Recently, Silda Chandra Sekhar College has been awarded C+ grade by the National Assessment and Accreditation Council (NAAC). The college is also recognized by the University Grants Commission (UGC).

See also

References

External links
http://www.scscollege.ac.in/

Universities and colleges in Jhargram district
Colleges affiliated to Vidyasagar University
Educational institutions established in 1971
1971 establishments in West Bengal